Pytilia is a genus of small brightly coloured seed-eating birds in the family Estrildidae. They are distributed across Africa.

Taxonomy
The genus Pytilia was introduced in 1837 by the English naturalist William John Swainson for the red-winged pytilia. The name Pytilia is a diminutive of the genus Pitylus that had been introduced in 1829 by the French naturalist Georges Cuvier for the grosbeaks. A molecular phylogenetic study has shown that the genus is basal to a clade containing the twinspots in the genera Euschistospiza, Hypargos and Clytospiza and the firefinches in Lagonosticta.

Species
The genus contains five species:

References